Split Airport, also known as Resnik Airport, is the international airport serving the city of Split, Croatia.

In 2019, the airport was the second busiest in Croatia after Zagreb Airport handling 3.3 million passengers. The airport was the busiest in Croatia in 2021 handling 1.57 million passengers, surpassing Zagreb Airport for the first time. It is a major destination for leisure flights during the European summer holiday season and an important seasonal base for Croatia Airlines that offers flights to European cities such as Athens, Frankfurt, London and Paris.

History
The first grass airfield was located in Sinj and the first commercial route was opened in 1931 by the Yugoslav airline Aeroput. It linked Zagreb with Belgrade through Rijeka, Split and Sarajevo, and maintained this route until the start of the Second World War. These flights connected Split either by its Divulje seaplane station, or by the Sinj airfield.

In the sixties, the airport was relocated from Sinj to Resnik. The new airport complex, designed by architect Darko Stipevski (Tehnika, Zagreb), was opened on 25 November 1966. The apron had dimensions of only 200 x 112 m and 6 parking positions with a planned capacity of 150,000 passengers. In 1968, passenger numbers already stood at 150,737 and in 1969 at 235,000. In 1967, the apron was extended for the first time to accommodate 10 aircraft.

A new larger terminal building designed by architect Branko Gruica (Projektant, Mostar) was constructed and opened in 1979 to accommodate traffic for the 8th Mediterranean Games held in Split in September of that year. The largest pre-war passenger numbers were achieved in 1987 totalling 1,151,580 passengers and 7,873 landings.

In 1991, the passenger figures dropped to nearly zero, as the war in the former Yugoslavia broke out. In the years that followed, most of the traffic were NATO and UN cargo planes, such as the C-5 Galaxy, MD-11, Boeing 747 and C-130 Hercules. After 1995, the civilian traffic figures began rising again, and eventually surpassed the 1987 record in 2008.

In 2005, the terminal got a major facelift by architect Ivan Vulić (VV-Projekt, Split) adding one more gate, the glass façade, as well as the award-winning Airport entrance structure consisting of steel/fabric "trees" illuminated by multi-colour LEDs.

The new apron designed by Ivan Vulić, Ivan Radeljak and Mate Žaja was constructed in 2011 with a capacity slightly over the old one but with better security conditions. The cost of this investment was €13 million leading to 34,000 m2  of new parking space for aircraft as well as space for future administrative works below the apron. The lower level houses warehouses, workshops, offices and other objects that will support the new 34,500 m2, HRK 455 million terminal building that is being built next to it. New apron features an unusual sound barrier on the south side which can be closed when an aircraft is close by and opened in all other times to allow for fairly unobstructed view of the Adriatic sea from the terminal building.

The airport's busiest time are the months of June, July and August due to a large influx of tourists for the European summer holiday period. Weekends are the busiest part of the week with more than 200 flights and some 50,000 passengers.

On the grounds of the airport there are some 1000 olive trees.

Expansion (2019)
Due to significant increase in passengers numbers, especially during the summer months, an expansion project was completed in summer of 2019, adding more than three times the floor space of the original terminal building and increasing the capacity to 5 million passengers per year. Original terminal has been refurbished and is still being used for some international departures, while check in, all domestic departures as well as both international and domestic arrivals including baggage claim is located in the new areas.

As a part of the expansion project, an enclosed bridge was built over the state road D409, taking passengers to the newly built parking lot, bus terminal and rental car facilities.

The decision not to include any jet bridges in the new expansion has been justified because of limited apron space as well as the fact that majority of the airlines at the airport are low-cost carriers.

Airlines and destinations
The following airlines operate regular scheduled and charter flights at Split Airport:

Statistics

Transport links

Bus
Split Airport can be reached from Split (and Trogir, where indicated) by public buses: 
Promet line no. 37 (Split-Airport-Trogir and Trogir-Airport-Split), terminating at the Sukoišan bus terminal in Split (about 10 minutes walking from the old town, and 20 minutes from the main bus/railway station), departing every 20 minutes on weekdays and every 30 minutes on Saturdays, Sundays and holidays 
Promet line no. 2 (Split-Strinje-Airport)

The airport is also easily reachable by shuttles, taxis or private cars. Numerous car rental companies are available on the site.

Ship
A catamaran service between the airport and Split harbour is available every 90 minutes in the peak tourist season (15 July – 30 September) and with lower frequency through October. Another line connecting the airport two additional times daily with Split harbour and Bol on Brač island is available from June to mid-September.

Rail
The airport is linked onto the Split suburban railway with a Promet bus line running eight times daily between the nearest train station (Kaštel Stari) and the airport with a joint ticket.

According to Split city administration plans, starting from 2025–6 the Split suburban railway will be extended to the airport.

References

External links

 Official website

Airports in Croatia
Airports established in 1966
1966 establishments in Yugoslavia
Airport
Buildings and structures in Split-Dalmatia County
Transport in Split-Dalmatia County